Chronic limb threatening ischemia (CLTI), also known as critical limb ischemia (CLI), is an advanced stage of peripheral artery disease (PAD). It is defined as ischemic rest pain, arterial insufficiency ulcers, and gangrene. The latter two conditions are jointly referred to as tissue loss, reflecting the development of surface damage to the limb tissue due to the most severe stage of ischemia. Compared to the other manifestation of PAD, intermittent claudication, CLI has a negative prognosis within a year after the initial diagnosis, with 1-year amputation rates of approximately 12% and mortality of 50% at 5 years and 70% at 10 years.

CLI was conceived to identify patients at high-risk for major amputation, but the increasing prevalence of diabetes mellitus has led to a broader conception of limb threat that  includes the risk of amputation associated with severely infected and non-healing wounds.

Signs and symptoms
Critical limb ischemia includes rest pain and tissue loss.

Rest pain
Rest pain is a continuous burning pain of the lower leg or feet.  It begins, or is aggravated, after reclining or elevating the limb and is relieved by sitting or standing. It is more severe than intermittent claudication, which is also a pain in the legs from arterial insufficiency.

Tissue loss
Tissue loss is the development of arterial insufficiency ulcers or gangrene due to peripheral artery disease.

Diagnosis
Critical limb ischemia is diagnosed by the presence of ischemic rest pain, and an ulcers that will not heal or gangrene due to insufficient blood flow. Insufficient blood flow may be confirmed by ankle-brachial index (ABI), ankle pressure, toe-brachial index (TBI), toe systolic pressure, transcutaneous oxygen measurement (TcPo2 ), or skin perfusion pressure (SPP).

Other factors which may point to a diagnosis of critical limb ischemia are a Buerger's angle of less than 20 degrees during Buerger's test, a capillary refill of more than 15 seconds or diminished or absent pulses.

Critical limb ischemia is different from acute limb ischemia. Acute limb ischemia is a sudden lack of blood flow to the limb, for example caused by an embolus whereas critical limb ischemia is a late sign of a progressive chronic disease.

Treatment
Treatment mirrors that of other symptoms of peripheral artery disease, and includes modifying risk factors, revascularization via vascular bypass or angioplasty, and in the case of tissue loss, wound debridement.

Research
As of 2015 pCMV-vegf165, a gene-therapy was being studied in critical limb ischemia.
In 2014, a trial was started to better understand the best revascularization technique for CLI.  As of 2017, it had enrolled nearly half of the 2100 people needed to complete the trial. A similar study, BASIL 2 (Bypass Versus Angio plasty in Severe Ischaemia of the Leg), is being conducted in the United Kingdom.

References

External links
 Cochrane Peripheral Vascular Diseases Review Group

Hypertension